The Medes  (Akkadian:  ,  ;;) were an ancient Iranian people who spoke the Median language and who inhabited an area known as Media between western and northern Iran. Around the 11th century BC, they occupied the mountainous region of northwestern Iran and the northeastern and eastern region of Mesopotamia located in the region of Hamadan (Ecbatana). Their consolidation in Iran is believed to have occurred during the 8th century BC. In the 7th century BC, all of western Iran and some other territories were under Median rule, but their precise geographic extent remains unknown.

Although they are generally recognized as having an important place in the history of the ancient Near East, the Medes have left no written source to reconstruct their history, which is known only from foreign sources such as the Assyrians, Babylonians, Armenians and Greeks, as well as a few Iranian archaeological sites, which are believed to have been occupied by Medes. The accounts relating to the Medes reported by Herodotus have left the image of a powerful people, who would have formed an empire at the beginning of the 7th century BC that lasted until the 550s BC, played a determining role in the fall of the Assyrian Empire and competed with the powerful kingdoms of Lydia and Babylonia. However, a recent reassessment of contemporary sources from the Mede period has altered scholars' perceptions of the Median state. The state remains difficult to perceive in the documentation, which leaves many doubts about it, some specialists even suggesting that there never was a powerful Median kingdom. In any case, it appears that after the fall of the last Median king against Cyrus the Great of the Persian Empire, Media became an important province and was prized by the empires which successively dominated it (Achaemenids, Seleucids, Parthians and Sasanids).

Tribes
According to the Histories of Herodotus, there were six Median tribes:

The six Median tribes resided in Media proper, the triangular area between Rhagae, Aspadana and Ecbatana. In present-day Iran, that is the area between Tehran, Isfahan and Hamadan, respectively. Of the Median tribes, the Magi resided in Rhagae, modern Tehran. They were of a sacred caste which ministered to the spiritual needs of the Medes. The Paretaceni tribe resided in and around Aspadana, modern Isfahan, the Arizanti lived in and around Kashan (Isfahan Province), and the Busae tribe lived in and around the future Median capital of Ecbatana, near modern Hamadan. The Struchates and the Budii lived in villages in the Median triangle.

Etymology
The original source for their name and homeland is a directly transmitted Old Iranian geographical name which is attested as the Old Persian "Māda-". The meaning of this word is not precisely known. However, the linguist W. Skalmowski proposes a relation with the proto-Indo European word "med(h)-", meaning "central, suited in the middle", by referring to the Old Indic "madhya-" and Old Iranian "maidiia-" which both carry the same meaning. The Latin medium, Greek méso, Armenian mej, and English mid are similarly derived from it.

Greek scholars during antiquity would base ethnological conclusions on Greek legends and the similarity of names. According to the Histories of Herodotus (440 BC):

Mythology
In the Greek myth of Jason and the Argonauts, Medea is the daughter of King Aeëtes of Colchis and a paternal granddaughter of the sun-god Helios. Following her failed marriage to Jason while in Corinth, for one of several reasons depending on the version, she marries King Aegeus of Athens and bears a son Medus. After failing to make Aegeus kill his older son Theseus, she and her son fled to Aria, where the Medes take their name from her, according to several Greek and later Roman accounts, including in Pausanias' Description of Greece (1st-century AD). According to other versions, such as in Strabo's Geographica (1st-century AD) and Justin's Epitoma Historiarum Philippicarum (2nd or 3rd century AD), she returned home to conquer neighboring lands with her husband Jason, one of which was named after her; while another version related by Diodorus Siculus in Bibliotheca Historica (1st-century BC) states that after being exiled she married an Asian king and bore Medus, who was greatly admired for his courage, after whom they took their name.

Archaeology

The discoveries of Median sites in Iran happened only after the 1960s. Prior to the 1960s, the search for Median archeological sources has mostly focused in an area known as the "Median triangle", defined roughly as the region bounded by Hamadān and Malāyer (in Hamadan Province) and Kangāvar (in Kermanshah Province). Three major sites from central western Iran in the Iron Age III period (i.e. 850–500 BC) are:
 Tepe Nush-i Jan (a primarily religious site of Median period),
The site is located 14 km west of Malāyer in Hamadan province. The excavations started in 1967 with David Stronach as the director. The remains of four main buildings in the site are "the central temple, the western temple, the fort, and the columned hall" which according to Stronach were likely to have been built in the order named and predate the latter occupation of the first half of the 6th century BC. According to Stronach, the central temple, with its stark design, "provides a notable, if mute, expression of religious belief and practice". A number of ceramics from the Median levels at Tepe Nush-i Jan have been found which are associated with a period (the second half of the 7th century BC) of power consolidation in the Hamadān areas. These findings show four different wares known as "common ware" (buff, cream, or light red in colour and with gold or silver mica temper) including jars in various size the largest of which is a form of ribbed pithoi. Smaller and more elaborate vessels were in "grey ware", (these display smoothed and burnished surface). The "cooking ware" and "crumbly ware" are also recognized each in single handmade products.
 Godin Tepe (its period II: a fortified palace of a Median king or tribal chief),
The site is located 13 km east of Kangāvar city on the left bank of the river Gamas Āb". The excavations, started in 1965, were led by T. C. Young, Jr. According to David Stronach, the evidence shows an important Bronze Age construction that was reoccupied sometime before the beginning of the Iron III period. The excavations of Young indicate the remains of part of a single residence of a local ruler which later became quite substantial. This is similar to those mentioned often in Assyrian sources.
 Babajan (probably the seat of a lesser tribal ruler of Media).
The site is located in northeastern Lorestan with a distance of roughly 10 km from Nūrābād in Lorestan province. The excavations were conducted by C. Goff in 1966–69. The second level of this site probably dates to the 7th century BC.
These sources have both similarities (in cultural characteristics) and differences (due to functional differences and diversity among the Median tribes). The architecture of these archaeological findings, which can probably be dated to the Median period, show a link between the tradition of columned audience halls often seen in the Achaemenid Empire (for example in Persepolis) and Safavid Iran (for example in Chehel Sotoun from the 17th century AD) and what is seen in Median architecture.

The materials found at Tepe Nush-i Jan, Godin Tepe, and other sites located in Media together with the Assyrian reliefs show the existence of urban settlements in Media in the first half of the 1st millennium BC which had functioned as centres for the production of handicrafts and also of an agricultural and cattle-breeding economy of a secondary type. For other historical documentation, the archaeological evidence, though rare, together with cuneiform records by Assyrian make it possible, regardless of Herodotus' accounts, to establish some of the early history of Medians.

Geography

An early description of Media from the end of the 9th century BC to the beginning of the 7th century BC comes from the Assyrians. The southern border of Media, in that period, is named as the Elamite region of Simaški in present-day Lorestan Province. To the west and northwest, Media was bounded by the Zagros Mountains and from the east by the Dasht-e Kavir desert. This region of Media was ruled by the Assyrians and for them the region fell "along the Great Khorasan Road from just east of Harhar to Alwand, and probably beyond." The location of Harhar is suggested to be "the central or eastern" Mahidasht District in Kermanshah Province.

Its borders were limited in the north by the non-Iranian states of Gizilbunda and Mannea, and to its south by Ellipi and Elam. Gizilbunda was located in the Qaflankuh Mountains, and Ellipi was located in the south of modern Lorestan Province. On the east and southeast of Media, as described by the Assyrians, another land with the name of "Patušarra" appears. This land was located near a mountain range which the Assyrians call "Bikni" and describe as "Lapis Lazuli Mountain". There are differing opinions on the location of this mountain. Mount Damavand of Tehran and Alvand of Hamadan are two proposed sites. This location is the most remote eastern area that the Assyrians knew of or reached during their expansion until the beginning of the 7th century BC.

In Achaemenid sources, specifically from the Behistun Inscription (2.76, 77–78), the capital of Media is Ecbatana, called "Hamgmatāna-" in Old Persian (Elamite:Agmadana-; Babylonian: Agamtanu-) corresponding to modern-day Hamadan.

The other cities existing in Media were Laodicea (modern Nahavand) and the mound that was the largest city of the Medes, Rhages (present-day Rey). The fourth city of Media was Apamea, near Ecbatana, whose precise location is now unknown. In later periods, Medes and especially Mede soldiers are identified and portrayed prominently in ancient archaeological sites such as Persepolis, where they are shown to have a major role and presence in the military of the Achaemenid Empire.

History

Prehistory

At the end of the 2nd millennium BC, the Iranian tribes emerged in the region of northwest Iran. These tribes expanded their control over larger areas. Subsequently, the boundaries of Media changed over a period of several hundred years. Iranian tribes were present in western and northwestern Iran from at least the 12th or 11th centuries BC. But the significance of Iranian elements in these regions were established from the beginning of the second half of the 8th century BC. By this time the Iranian tribes were the majority in what later become the territory of the Median Kingdom and also the west of Media proper. A study of textual sources from the region shows that in the Neo-Assyrian period, the regions of Media, and further to the west and the northwest, had a population with Iranian speaking people as the majority.

This period of migration coincided with a power vacuum in the Near East with the Middle Assyrian Empire (1365–1020 BC), which had dominated northwestern Iran and eastern Anatolia and the Caucasus, going into a comparative decline. This allowed new peoples to pass through and settle. In addition Elam, the dominant power in Iran, was suffering a period of severe weakness, as was Babylonia to the west.

In western and northwestern Iran and in areas further west prior to Median rule, there is evidence of the earlier political activity of the powerful societies of Elam, Mannaea, Assyria and Urartu. There are various and up-dated opinions on the positions and activities of Iranian tribes in these societies and prior to the "major Iranian state formations" in the late 7th century BC. One opinion (of Herzfeld, et al.) is that the ruling class were "Iranian migrants" but the society was "autonomous" while another opinion (of Grantovsky, et al.) holds that both the ruling class and basic elements of the population were Iranian.

Rise and fall
From the 10th to the late 7th centuries BC, the western parts of Media fell under the domination of the vast Neo-Assyrian Empire based in northern Mesopotamia, which stretched from Cyprus in the west, to parts of western Iran in the east, and Egypt and the north of the Arabian Peninsula. Assyrian kings such as Tiglath-Pileser III, Sargon II, Sennacherib, Esarhaddon, Ashurbanipal and Ashur-etil-ilani imposed Vassal Treaties upon the Median rulers, and also protected them from predatory raids by marauding Scythians and Cimmerians.

During the reign of Sinsharishkun (622–612 BC), the Assyrian empire, which had been in a state of constant civil war since 626 BC, began to unravel. Subject peoples, such as the Medes, Babylonians, Chaldeans, Egyptians, Scythians, Cimmerians, Lydians and Arameans quietly ceased to pay tribute to Assyria.

Neo-Assyrian dominance over the Medians came to an end during the reign of Median King Cyaxares, who, in alliance with King Nabopolassar of the Neo-Babylonian Empire, attacked and destroyed the strife-riven Neo-Assyrian empire between 616 and 609 BC. The newfound alliance helped the Medes to capture Nineveh in 612 BC, which resulted in the eventual collapse of the Neo-Assyrian Empire by 609 BC. The Medes were subsequently able to establish their Median Kingdom (with Ecbatana as their royal capital) beyond their original homeland and had eventually a territory stretching roughly from northeastern Iran to the Kızılırmak River in Anatolia. After the fall of Assyria between 616 BC and 609 BC, a unified Median state was formed, which together with Babylonia, Lydia, and ancient Egypt became one of the four major powers of the ancient Near East.

Cyaxares was succeeded by his son King Astyages. In 553 BC, his maternal grandson Cyrus the Great, the King of Anshan/Persia, a Median vassal, revolted against Astyages. In 550 BC, Cyrus finally won a decisive victory resulting in Astyages' capture by his own dissatisfied nobles, who promptly turned him over to the triumphant Cyrus. After Cyrus's victory against Astyages, the Medes were subjected to their close kin, the Persians. In the new empire they retained a prominent position; in honour and war, they stood next to the Persians; their court ceremony was adopted by the new sovereigns, who in the summer months resided in Ecbatana; and many noble Medes were employed as officials, satraps and generals.

Median dynasty
The list of Median rulers and their period of reign is compiled according to two sources. Firstly, Herodotus who calls them "kings" and associates them with the same family. Secondly, the Babylonian Chronicle which in "Gadd's Chronicle on the Fall of Nineveh" gives its own list. A combined list stretching over 150 years is thus:

 Deioces (700s–675 BC)
 Phraortes (675–653 BC)
 Scythian rule (652–624 BC)
 Cyaxares (624–585 BC)
 Astyages (585–549 BC)

However, not all of these dates and personalities given by Herodotus match the other near eastern sources.

In Herodotus (book 1, chapters 95–130), Deioces is introduced as the founder of a centralised Median state. He had been known to the Median people as "a just and incorruptible man" and when asked by the Median people to solve their possible disputes he agreed and put forward the condition that they make him "king" and build a great city at Ecbatana as the capital of the Median state. Judging from the contemporary sources of the region and disregarding the account of Herodotus puts the formation of a unified Median state during the reign of Cyaxares or later.

Historicity of a Median Empire 

Until the late 20th-century, scholarship generally agreed that the emergence of a Median "empire" took place following the collapse of the Assyrian Empire. The Median "empire" was said to have ruled over a vast chunk of the Ancient Near East until its last king, Astyages, was overthrown by his own vassal, Cyrus the Great. The historicity of these events was first put into question by the modern historian Heleen Sancisi‐Weerdenburg, whose works have revealed many of their complications and flaws. She especially criticized the asserted "imperial" system and style of the Medes, which she noted had noticeable contrasts with other imperial kingdoms of the Ancient Near East. She also highlighted that practically only Greek sources were used by modern historiography to construct Median history, and that Ancient Near Eastern sources were almost fully ignored. However, the majority of scholarship did not support her suggestions. In 2001, an international symposium was held in Padua to review all accessible sources in order to present an accurate as possible account of Median history. Due to the lack of sources, no consensus was reached. However, it was generally agreed that there was no proof of the existence of a Median "empire" and that it should therefore be considered a hypothesis.

Culture and society
Greek references to "Median" people make no clear distinction between the "Persians" and the "Medians"; in fact for a Greek to become "too closely associated with Iranian culture" was "to become Medianized, not Persianized". The Median Kingdom was a short-lived Iranian state and the textual and archaeological sources of that period are rare and little could be known from the Median culture which nevertheless made a "profound, and lasting, contribution to the greater world of Iranian culture".

The Medes contributed scientifically and philosophically to other civilizations, especially after their invasion of Mesopotamia and during the united Median state era.

Language

Median people spoke the Median language, which was an Old Iranian language. Strabo's Geographica (finished in the early first century) mentions the affinity of Median with other Iranian languages: "The name of Ariana is further extended to a part of Persia and of Media, as also to the Bactrians and Sogdians on the north; for these speak approximately the same language, but with slight variations".

No original deciphered text has been proven to have been written in the Median language. It is suggested that similar to the later Iranian practice of keeping archives of written documents in Achaemenid Iran, there was also a maintenance of archives by the Median government in their capital Ecbatana. There are examples of "Median literature" found in later records. One is according to Herodotus that the Median king Deioces, appearing as a judge, made judgement on causes submitted in writing. There is also a report by Dinon on the existence of "Median court poets". Median literature is part of the "Old Iranian literature" (including also Saka, Old Persian, Avestan) as this Iranian affiliation of them is explicit also in ancient texts, such as Herodotus's account that many peoples including Medes were "universally called Iranian".

Words of Median origin appear in various other Iranian dialects, including Old Persian. A feature of Old Persian inscriptions is the large number of words and names from other languages and the Median language takes in this regard a special place for historical reasons. The Median words in Old Persian texts, whose Median origin can be established by "phonetic criteria", appear "more frequently among royal titles and among terms of the chancellery, military, and judicial affairs". Words of Median origin include:

*čiθra-: "origin". The word appears in *čiθrabṛzana- (med.) "exalting his linage", *čiθramiθra- (med.) "having mithraic origin", *čiθraspāta- (med.) "having a brilliant army", etc.
Farnah: Divine glory
Paridaiza: Paradise
Spaka- : The word is Median and means "dog". Herodotus identifies "Spaka-" (Gk. "σπάχα" – female dog) as Median rather than Persian. The word is still used in modern Iranian languages including Talyshi, also suggested as a source to the Russian word for dog sobaka.
vazṛka-: "great" (as Western Persian bozorg)
vispa-: "all" (as in Avestan). The component appears in such words as vispafryā (Med. fem.) "dear to all", vispatarva- (med.) "vanquishing all", vispavada- (Median-Old Persian) "leader of all", etc.
xšayaθiya- (king)
xšaθra- (realm; kingship): This Median word (attested in *xšaθra-pā- and continued by Middle Persian šahr "land, country; city") is an example of words whose Greek form (known as romanized "satrap" from Gk. σατράπης satrápēs) mirrors, as opposed to the tradition, a Median rather than an Old Persian form (also attested, as xšaça- and xšaçapāvā) of an Old Iranian word.
 zūra-: "evil" and zūrakara-: "evil-doer".

Religion

There are very limited sources concerning the religion of Median people. Primary sources pointing to religious affiliations of Medes found so far include the archaeological discoveries in Tepe Nush-e Jan, personal names of Median individuals, and the Histories of Herodotus. The archaeological source gives the earliest of the temple structures in Iran and the "stepped fire altar" discovered there is linked to the common Iranian legacy of the "cult of fire". Herodotus mentions Median Magi as a Median tribe providing priests for both the Medes and the Persians. They had a "priestly caste" which passed their functions from father to son. They played a significant role in the court of the Median king Astyages who had in his court certain Medians as "advisers, dream interpreters, and soothsayers".

Classical historians "unanimously" regarded the Magi as priests of the Zoroastrian faith. From the personal names of Medes as recorded by Assyrians (in 8th and 9th centuries BC) there are examples of the use of the Indo-Iranian word arta- (lit. "truth") which is familiar from both Avestan and Old Persian and also examples of theophoric names containing Maždakku and also the name "Ahura Mazdā". Scholars disagree whether these are indications of Zoroastrian religion amongst the Medes. Diakonoff believes that "Astyages and perhaps even Cyaxares had already embraced a religion derived from the teachings of Zoroaster" and Mary Boyce believes that "the existence of the Magi in Media with their own traditions and forms of worship was an obstacle to Zoroastrian proselytizing there". Boyce wrote that the Zoroastrian traditions in the Median city of Ray probably goes back to the 8th century BC. It is suggested that from the 8th century BC, a form of "Mazdaism with common Iranian traditions" existed in Media and the strict reforms of Zarathustra began to spread in western Iran during the reign of the last Median kings in the 6th century BC.

It has also been suggested that Mithra is a Median name and Medes may have practised Mithraism and had Mithra as their supreme deity.

Kurds and Medes

Russian historian and linguist Vladimir Minorsky suggested that the Medes, who widely inhabited the land where currently the Kurds form a majority, might have been forefathers of the modern Kurds. He also states that the Medes who invaded the region in the eighth century BC, linguistically resembled the Kurds. This view was accepted by many Kurdish nationalists in the twentieth century. However, Martin van Bruinessen, a Dutch scholar, argues against the attempt to take the Medes as ancestors of the Kurds."Though some Kurdish intellectuals claim that their people are descended from the Medes, there is no evidence to permit such a connection across the considerable gap in time between the political dominance of the Medes and the first attestation of the Kurds" - van Bruinessen

Contemporary linguistic evidence has challenged the previously suggested view that the Kurds are descendants of the Medes. Gernot Ludwig Windfuhr, professor of Iranian Studies, identified the Kurdish languages as Parthian, albeit with a Median substratum. David Neil MacKenzie, an authority on the Kurdish language, said Kurdish was closer to Persian and questioned the "traditional" view holding that Kurdish, because of its differences from Persian, should be regarded as a Northwestern Iranian language. The Kurdologist and Iranologist Garnik Asatrian stated that "The Central Iranian dialects, and primarily those of the Kashan area in the first place, as well as the Azari dialects (otherwise called Southern Tati) are probably the only Iranian dialects, which can pretend to be the direct offshoots of Median... In general, the relationship between Kurdish and Median is not closer than the affinities between the latter and other North Western dialects – Baluchi, Talishi, South Caspian, Zaza, Gurani, Kurdish(Soranî, Kurmancî, Kelhorî) Asatrian also stated that "there is no serious ground to suggest a special genetic affinity within North-Western Iranian between this ancient language [Median] and Kurdish. The latter does not share even the generally ephemeric peculiarity of Median."

According to Alireza Shapour Shahbazi: "The Aryan tribes including the Medes (ancestors of many Iranians, particularly the Kurds), Persians, Hyrcanians (...)".

According to The Cambridge History of the Kurds,

See also

Greater Iran
Iranian Plateau
Linear Elamite – a script possibly used to write Median language
List of monarchs of Persia
List of rulers of the pre-Achaemenid kingdoms of Iran
Madai
Qanat – water management system

Notes

References

Sources

Further reading
 "Mede." Encyclopædia Britannica. 2008. Encyclopædia Britannica Online. 16 January 2008.

External links

 Median Empire at Iran Chamber Society website.

 
Historical Iranian peoples
States and territories established in the 7th century BC
States and territories disestablished in the 6th century BC
7th century BC in Iran
Ancient Near East
Empires and kingdoms of Iran
Former empires in Asia
Ancient Armenia
History of Turkey
Ancient history of the Caucasus
1st-millennium BC establishments in Iran
549 BC
6th century BC in Iran
6th-century BC disestablishments
1st-millennium BC disestablishments in Iran
Historical geography of Iran